The Urfa resistance was an effort by some Ottoman Armenians in Urfa to defend themselves against the Armenian genocide launched by the Ottoman Empire.  The resistance was quelled following German intervention.

On May 27, 1915, several hundred Armenians were held captive by Ottoman authorities in Urfa. The community held a meeting in order to adopt a solution. The participants thought of many different tactics. Mgrdich Yotneghparian and his partisans were among the few who preferred to fight to the  death rather than yielding to the Ottomans. The Adana massacre of 1909 had made Yotneghparian increasingly cautious of the new Young Turk government and the Turkish constitution.

In Urfa massacres began in the middle of August; during August 15–19, 400 people were driven outside the town and killed, Armenians in Urfa rather being deported and killed preferred to put up a resistance.

Led by Mgerdich, the resistance of the Armenian fighters in the heavily fortified stone houses began on 29 September and lasted 16 or 21 days and was eventually broken only with the help of a reinforcement contingent of six thousand Turkish troops, reportedly equipped with heavy artillery.

Former Aleppo governor, Mehmet Celal Bey, who was removed from his position because he opposed the deportation of Armenians, commented about the resistance: "Each human has the right to live. A kicked wolf will bite."

References

1915 in the Ottoman Empire
1910s in the Ottoman Empire
Armenian resistance during the Armenian genocide
1915 in Armenia
Aleppo vilayet
History of Şanlıurfa
September 1915 events
October 1915 events
     5. Source for the strengths and casualties: http://asbarez.com/arm/53642/%D5%B8%D6%82%D6%80%D6%86%D5%A1%D5%B5%D5%AB-%D5%B0%D5%A5%D6%80%D5%B8%D5%BD%D5%A1%D5%B4%D5%A1%D6%80%D5%BF%D5%A8/